IOOF Cemetery, or International Order of Odd Fellows Cemetery, is a cemetery located at 701 Smith Creek Road, near Southwestern University, in Georgetown, Texas, United States.

See also
 Old Georgetown Cemetery

References

External links
 
 

Cemeteries in Texas
Georgetown, Texas
Georgetown